Bmp greengas is Europe's leading distributor of biomethane and an expert in green gases, based in Munich. The company could record a portfolio volume of over 4 TWh/a in 2021. The business areas are purchasing, sales and balancing group management.

History 
Bmp greengas GmbH was founded in 2003. The business idea was to prepare biogas and feed it into the natural gas network. After several feasibility studies in the years 2004 and 2005, a biomethane plant was developed. This plant was built in Pliening in 2006 and was the first one to feed biogas directly into the natural gas network. In 2007, the project was outsourced to RES Projects GmbH.

Between 2007 and 2012, company founder Dr. Andreas Seebach expanded the affiliated companies into corporate groups with over 20 companies and participations. Due to the political changes in 2013 regarding the Renewable Energy Sources Act and the discussion about the capping of electricity prices, a realignment of the corporate structure became necessary.

In 2013, Volker Seebach joined the company as managing director and shareholder. Until the beginning of 2014, company founder Dr. Andreas Seebach and his brother managed the company together. From 2014, Volker Seebach was then the sole managing director. Volker Seebach reorganized both groups of companies, initiated the development of a trend-setting trading system and set the course for further growth. Under Volker Seebach, the company was able to consolidate its position as industry leader and increase sales from around 36 million to over 140 million euros.

In 2016 the company took over the biomethane distribution of VNG – Verbundnetz Gas. As of September 30, 2016, the last production holdings of bmp greengas GmbH, the biomethane plants Klein Wanzleben GmbH and Kroppenstedt GmbH, were sold to MVV Energie AG. According to the managing director at the time, Volker Seebach, this was done as part of the structural adjustment within bmp greengas GmbH in order to be able to focus exclusively on the core business of biomethane trading and system services from then on.

Since 2017, the company has been a subsidiary of Erdgas Südwest GmbH and thus part of EnBW Energie Baden-Württemberg AG. In 2019, the biomethane distribution of BayWa r.e. renewable energy GmbH was taken over. This increased the portfolio volume to over 3 TWh/a. Bmp greengas works with "Greenbook", a system that detects the origin of biogas. The Deutsche Energie-Agentur (German Energy Agency) is also working with this system.

This register was developed in 2009 and documents all biomethane quantities in the different development stages. The reason for the introduction of this system was the amendment of the Renewable Energy Sources Act 2009.

In March 2017, Erdgas Südwest GmbH, based in Ettlingen, acquired bmp greengas GmbH. Erwin Holl and Matthias Kerner took over the management of bmp greengas GmbH as dual leaders. The previous shareholders, Dr. Andreas and Volker Seebach, supported the company as advisors. Erwin Holl retired in July 2019, and Matthias Kerner has been the sole managing director since then. In January 2022, Matthias Kerner was replaced by Frank Erben as sole Managing Director. The company could record a portfolio volume of over 4 TWh/a in 2021. Stefan Schneider joined the management team on February 1, 2022. Since May 1, 2022, Sven Kraus is joining the management team of bmp greengas. On December 31, 2022, the interim Managing Director Frank Erben left bmp greengas as planned. As a team leader for subsidiary management at the partner company Erdgas Südwest GmbH, Frank Erben took over the management of bmp greengas on an interim basis a year ago. From January 1, 2023, will now be entirely in the hands of Stefan Schneider and Sven Kraus, who have already been managing the company together with Frank Erben in recent months.

Prices and Awards 
In 2009, the company received the first Innovation Award from dena (Deutsche Energie-Agentur) biogaspartner. The award was for the principle of taking volumes directly from biomethane feed-in plants and redistributing them to customers throughout Germany in line with demand. This way, the trading basis for the biomethane product was created. Since the sustainable gas is transported together with conventional natural gas in the German natural gas grid, the trading company developed a system certifying the proof of origin.

In 2017, bmp greengas was named one of the top 14 companies in the energy and utilities industry and was thus one of the 2017 growth champions according to FOCUS and Statista. With an average of 44 % growth per year, the company even came 5th in the ranking with other companies with annual sales of more than 100 million.

In 2022 as well as 2023 the company received the "Top Company" award from kununu. The label recognizes companies that ranked among the top five percent of companies on kununu. Employees were particularly appreciative of the peer-to-peer communication, the work-life balance and the variety of tasks.

References

External links 
 Official website

Biofuel producers
Renewable energy companies of Germany
Companies based in Munich
2007 establishments in Germany